Mulzer is a German surname. Notable people with the surname include:

Johann Mulzer (born 1944), German chemist
Josef-Georg Mulzer (1915–2011), German Wehrmacht officer
Max Ritter von Mulzer (1893–1916), German World War I flying ace

See also
Muller

German-language surnames